Pasteur's day gecko (Phelsuma v-nigra pasteuri ; synonym, Phelsuma pasteuri ) is a small diurnal subspecies of gecko. It lives in the Comoros and typically inhabits trees and bushes. Pasteur's day gecko feeds on insects and nectar.

Etymology
This subspecies (or species) is named pasteuri in honor of French herpetologist Georges Pasteur.

Description
This lizard belongs to the smallest day geckos. The body colour is bright green. The tail may be bright blue. There is a red v-shaped stripe on the snout and a red bar between the eyes. On the back there often are a number of small red-brick coloured dots. Typical is the turquoise blue patch in the neck region, which may be segmented by a small red dorsal stripe. A yellow ring around the eye is present. This subspecies doesn't have the typical v-shaped marking on the throat The ventral side is yellowish.

Distribution
This subspecies only inhabits the island Mayotte in the Comoros.

Habitat
Phelsuma v-nigra pasteuri is found on bushes and trees along streams.

Diet
These day geckos feed on various insects and other invertebrates. They also like to lick soft, sweet fruit, pollen and nectar.

Care and maintenance in captivity
These animals should be housed in pairs and need a medium-sized, well planted terrarium. The humidity should be not too high. In captivity, these animals can be fed with crickets, wax moth larvae, fruit flies, mealworms and houseflies.

References

Further reading
Henkel F-W, Schmidt W (1995). Amphibien und Reptilien Madagaskars, der Maskarenen, Seychellen und Komoren. Stuttgart: Ulmer. 311 pp. . (in German).
McKeown S (1993). The General Care and Maintenance of Day Geckos. Lakeside, California: Advanced Vivarium Systems.
Meier H (1984). "Zwei neue Formen der Gattung Phelsuma von den Komoren (Sauria: Gekkonidae) ". Salamandra 20 (1): 32-38. (Phelsuma v-nigra pasteuri, new subspecies). (in German).

Fauna of Mayotte
Phelsuma
Reptiles described in 1984